Medicine Ball Cabinet was a nickname given to the cabinet and advisors of President Herbert Hoover. The term arose because the president, cabinet members, and advisors would play regular games of Hooverball at the White House, during Hoover's administration.

See also 
Kitchen Cabinet

References 

Cabinet of the United States
Presidency of Herbert Hoover